The Amateur's Guide to Love is an American television game show, created by Merrill Heatter and Bob Quigley, that ran on CBS from March 27 to June 23, 1972. Gene Rayburn was the emcee, while Kenny Williams was the announcer. The theme was written by Mort Garson.

Each episode began with Garson's theme song, set to shots of a van emblazoned with the Amateur's Guide to Love logo driving around southern California, with scenes of men and women falling in love with each other. As the van travels around, host Gene Rayburn sets the scene for the game show:

Afterwards, the show would then cut to the studio, where announcer Kenny Williams would introduce this week's panelists ("our guidebook advisors"), and Rayburn.

Gameplay
The show somewhat resembled Candid Camera, a show involving guest celebrities and unsuspecting civilians. These people were involved in a comedy situation, taped on location in Southern California using a hidden camera. The subjects in the particular situation were faced with two choices, one of which they needed to choose, that were somehow related to sex, marriage, or love. A celebrity panel voted upon which choice would have been the smartest, and the civilian who picked that particular decision won merchandise prizes.

Broadcast history
Amateur's Guide originated as a pilot that aired as part of CBS' Comedy Playhouse on August 8, 1971. This early version of the series was hosted by actor Joe Flynn instead of Rayburn, and featured a four-celebrity panel (Rose Marie, Dick Martin, Michael Landon and Peter Marshall) instead of three.

The program was CBS' first daytime game since the cancellation of To Tell the Truth in September 1968. The series replaced reruns of Gomer Pyle, USMC at 4:00 PM (3:00 Central). However, the show failed to make an impact against Somerset on NBC and daytime rebroadcasts of the popular Love, American Style on ABC. Reruns of the sitcom Family Affair replaced it on June 26.

Later that year, CBS returned with game shows in its daytime lineup on September 4 with The New Price is Right, Gambit, and The Joker's Wild. Rayburn himself would return to CBS in July 1973 with a revival of his hit NBC show, Match Game.

Episode status
Like many game shows of the era, Amateur's Guide to Love is believed to have been wiped, as only one episode is known to exist. CBS stopped their wiping practices sometime in 1972, long before either of its other Big Three networks, but some series of the time have uncertain statuses.

References

External links
 The Amateur's Guide to Love on IMDb

American hidden camera television series
American dating and relationship reality television series
CBS original programming
1970s American comedy game shows
1972 American television series debuts
1972 American television series endings
Television series by Heatter-Quigley Productions
Television series by MGM Television